Duane Butler (born November 9, 1973) is a former gridiron football linebacker / defensive back. He played college football at Illinois State.

College career 
Duane Butler attended Illinois State University. While there, he was a three time All-Conference selection, and left school with the school's fifth most career tackles record with 332 tackles.

Professional career 
Butler began his career as a free agent, eventually playing in the NFL for the Minnesota Vikings, in 1997 for three games and in 1998 for fourteen games. In 1998, he also played for the London Monarchs of the NFL Europa. In 1999, he tried out for the Cleveland Browns. In 2000, he played for the Berlin Thunder of NFL Europa. 2001 was a busy year, as Butler played 15 games with the Hamilton Tiger-Cats of the CFL, and a season with the Birmingham Thunderbolts of the XFL. After another season in Hamilton (2002), Butler found a home with the Montreal Alouettes, where he has played for the past 4 seasons (to 2006). In 2003, he tied the Alouettes records for most sacks in a game, with 5 against the Winnipeg Blue Bombers.

References 

1973 births
Living people
American football linebackers
Berlin Thunder players
Birmingham Thunderbolts players
Canadian football linebackers
Eastern Michigan Eagles football players
Hamilton Tiger-Cats players
Illinois State Redbirds football players
London Monarchs players
Minnesota Vikings players
Montreal Alouettes players
People from Trotwood, Ohio